Wakabayashi is a Japanese surname. Notable people with the surname include:

, Japanese actress
Arthur Tsuneo Wakabayashi (born 1932), Canadian civil servant
, Japanese stock critic and radio personality
, Japanese actor
Herb Wakabayashi (1944–2015), Canadian ice hockey player
, Japanese architect
, Japanese basketball player
, Japanese physicist
, Japanese sprinter
, Japanese footballer
, Japanese politician
, Japanese comedian, television presenter and actor
Mel Wakabayashi (born 1943), Canadian ice hockey player
, Japanese actress and voice actress
, Japanese politician
, Japanese baseball player
, Japanese baseball player
, Japanese footballer

Fictional characters
Genzo Wakabayashi, a character in the manga series Captain Tsubasa
, a character in the manga series Ojisan to Marshmallow
Wakabayashi-kun, a character in the manga series Chibi Maruko-chan

See also
Wakabayashi Station (disambiguation), multiple railway stations in Japan
5128 Wakabayashi, a main-belt asteroid
Wakabayashi-ku, Sendai, a ward in Sendai, Miyagi Prefecture, Japan

Japanese-language surnames